KQZB is an FM radio station licensed to Troy, Idaho and broadcasting on a frequency of 100.5 Megahertz. From 2016 to 2019, the station was known as "Hits 100" and owned by Pullman Radio Inc. In September 2019, the station was renamed as "100.5 KQZB" and was sold to the Pacific Empire Radio Corporation

KQZB airs a classic hits format and is owned by Pacific Empire Radio Corporation.

References

External links

QZB
Radio stations established in 2008
2008 establishments in Idaho